Nico Asher Muhly (born August 26, 1981) is an American contemporary classical music composer and arranger who has worked and recorded with both classical and pop musicians. A prolific composer, he has composed for many notable symphony orchestras and chamber ensembles and has had two operas commissioned by the Metropolitan Opera. Since 2006, he has released nine studio albums, many of which are collaborative, including 2017's Planetarium with Sufjan Stevens, Bryce Dessner & James McAlister. He is a member of the Icelandic music collective and record label Bedroom Community.

Biography

Early years and personal life
Muhly was born in Vermont to Bunny Harvey, a painter and teacher at Wellesley College, and Frank Muhly, a documentary filmmaker. Muhly was raised in Providence, Rhode Island, and sang in the choir at Grace Episcopal Church in Providence. He began studying piano at age 10.

Muhly went on to study at the Wheeler School in Providence. As part of a dual-degree program, he attended Columbia University and the Juilliard School. He graduated from the former in 2003 with a Bachelor of Arts in English and received a Master's degree in music in 2004 from Juilliard, where he studied composition with John Corigliano and Christopher Rouse.

In 2014, he told the New York Times that he lives in the Lower East Side neighborhood of Manhattan in New York City with his boyfriend of several years, Ben Wyskida, a political consultant. He wrote about his mental-health problems in 2015.

Career
As a first-year master's student at Juilliard at age 22, Muhly began working for Philip Glass as an archivist, and later an editor, conductor, and keyboardist, for eight years.

Muhly worked in collaboration with Björk on the DVD single "Oceania" in 2004; in 2005, he was commissioned by Colorado Academy, a private school in Colorado, to write a song for the opening of their Fine Arts building.

In 2006, he released his first album of works, titled Speaks Volumes, and in 2008, his second album, titled Mothertongue.

In a 2007 interview with Molly Sheridan on NewMusicBox, Muhly explained that while he considers himself a classical music composer, that does not preclude his working in a variety of musical genres: "It's essentially like being from somewhere. I feel like I'm very proudly from the classical tradition. It's like being from Nebraska. Like you are from there if you're from there. It doesn't mean that you can't have a productive life somewhere else. The notion of your genre being something that you have to actively perform, I think is pretty vile."

In 2009, Muhly did choral and string quartet arrangements for four of the songs on Brooklyn-based indie rock band Grizzly Bear's third album, Veckatimest, and he worked with Antony and the Johnsons on the albums The Crying Light and Swanlights.

In 2009 Muhly was co-commissioned with Valgeir Sigurdsson by Works and Process at the Guggenheim to compose the music for Green Aria, A ScentOpera, created and directed by Stewart Matthew, that featured scents as dramatis personae that were streamed from "scent microphones."

Muhly worked on two commissions for the UK-based Britten Sinfonia, performed in January and February 2010. Gilmore International Keyboard Festival commissioned "Drones & Piano" for pianist Bruce Brubaker, which premiered in May 2010.

Muhly's opera Two Boys, a collaboration with librettist Craig Lucas and directed by Bartlett Sher, premiered in June 2011 at the English National Opera and made its Metropolitan Opera debut on October 21, 2013. According to a 2008 New York Times article, the opera is based on a late-1990s British case involving a 14-year-old boy taking on the online identity of women to try to get someone to kill him, without success. However, in a 2008 interview with The Advocate, Muhly stated that the opera is based on the true story of an online friendship between two male teenagers, one of whom stabs the other. The opera was reworked both before and after its 2011 premiere. The first recording of the piece, from the Met production, was released on Nonesuch Records in 2014.

The Saint Paul Chamber Orchestra, the Minnesota Commissioning Club, Cantus, the Andrew W. Mellon Foundation, and Alfred P. and Ann M. Moore commissioned Luminous Body, also a collaboration with librettist Craig Lucas. The piece premiered on September 9, 2011.

In 2013, he toured with Glen Hansard. They performed together with the BBC Scottish Symphony Orchestra in Eindhoven and Amsterdam.

His 2008 musical collaboration, Confessions, with Faroese singer-songwriter Teitur was released in 2016 by Nonesuch Records.

Muhly contributed to the 2018 re-recording of David Bowie's 1987 album Never Let Me Down. 

In 2020 Muhly completed a "virtual premiere" for the San Francisco Symphony during the COVID-19 pandemic, titled Throughline. The 19-minute piece features eight collaborative artists selected by Music Director Esa-Pekka Salonen. Muhly also composed and recorded Trombone Phrases for Sound World’s Coronavirus Fund for Freelance Musicians, a project supporting struggling musicians during the UK’s Covid 19 lockdown. It was released by Sound World as part of the album Reflections (credited to Sound World and the Bristol Ensemble) alongside specially written pieces by other composers such as Gavin Bryars, Mark-Anthony Turnage, Evelyn Glennie and Sally Beamish.

His composition for full choir and 12 guitars How Little You Are for Conspirare Company of Voices, Los Angeles Guitar Quartet, Dublin Guitar Quartet and Texas Guitar Quartet commissioned by Texas Performing Arts at The University of Texas at Austin was released on Conspiriare's 2020 album The Singing Guitar. 

In 2021 his composition Shrink appeared on Violinist Pekka Kuusisto's album First Light released by Pentatone.

Compositions and projects

Choral
2003 Set Me as a Seal
2004 First Service
2004 Like as the Hart
2005 A Good Understanding
2005 Bright Mass with Canons
2005 Expecting the Main Things from You
2005 I Cannot Attain Unto It
2006 The Sweets of Evening
2007 Syllables
2008 Pater Noster
2008 Senex Puerum Portabat
2009 I Drink the Air Before Me
2011 Luminous Body
2011 Grief Is the Price We Pay for Love
2013 An Outrage (BBC commission)
2014 Sentences

Film
2006 Choking Man
2006 Cricket Head
2007 Joshua
2006 Wonder Showzen, "Clarence Special Report"
2008 The Reader
2009 Felicitas
2011 Margaret
2013 Kill Your Darlings
2017 How to Talk to Girls at Parties
2017 Far From the Tree
2018 The Seagull
2020 Worth
2020 Gift of Fire
2021 The Humans

Television
2017 Howards End
2022 Pachinko

Opera
2010 Dark Sisters
2011 Two Boys
2017 Marnie

Incidental
2005 Iphigenia at Aulis
2007 The Magnificent Cuckold
2008 Prayer for My Enemy

Orchestra
2001–2002 Fits & Bursts
2003 Out of the Loop
2004 By All Means
2004 So to Speak
2006 It Remains to Be Seen
2006 Wish You Were Here
2007 From Here on Out
2008 Step Team
2009 The Only Tune
2009 Drones on O Lord, Whose Mercies Numberless
2009 Impossible Things
2010 Detailed Instructions
2011 Edge of the World
2012 So Far So Good
2012 Gait (BBC commission)
2013 Bright Mass with Cannons
2015 Mixed Messages
2020 Throughline (San Francisco Symphony Orchestra commission)

Orchestra & Soloist
2005 Keep in Touch, for viola and orchestra (or tape)
2007 Seeing is Believing, for six-string electric violin and chamber orchestra
2012 Cello Concerto
2012 Double Standard, for two percussionists and orchestra
2014 Viola Concerto
2014 Seeing is Believing, for six-string electric violin and orchestra
2017 Register, Concerto for Organ and Orchestra
2018 Reliable Sources, for bassoon and orchestra
2019 Cello Cycles
2020 In Certain Cycles, Concerto for Two Pianos and Orchestra
2021 Shrink, Concerto for Violin and String Orchestra

Piano
2003 Three Études for Piano
2005 A Hudson Cycle
2005 Pillaging Music
2007 Skip Town
2010 Drones & Piano
2012 You Can't Get There From Here

Percussion
2002 Beaming Music
2003 Time After Time
2005 Ta & Clap
2006 It's About Time
2008 I Shudder to Think

Small ensemble
2002 Beaming Music
2003 Clear Music
2003 Flexible Music
2003 Duet No 1: Chorale Pointing Downwards
2003 Reading into it
2004 By All Means
2004 You Could Have Asked Me
2004 Ta and Clap
2005 The Elements of Style
2005 Stride
2005 Pillaging Music
2006 How About Now
2006 Fast Music with Folk Songs
2007 I Know Where Everything Is
2007 Principles of Uncertainty
2008 Triade
2008 Mothertongue
2008 Wonders
2008 The Only Tune
2008 Common Ground
2009 I Drink the Air Before Me
2009 Motion
2009 Farewell Photography
2010 Diacritical Marks
2010 Drones & Piano
2011 Drones & Viola
2012 Drones & Violin
2012 Doublespeak
2014 Fast Dances
2015 Look For Me
2017 Planetarium

Solo
2002 Radiant Music
2003 Honest Music
2003 A Long Line
2005 Keep in Touch
2005 Pillaging Music
2005 It Goes without Saying

Voice
2003 Employment
2005 The Elements of Style
2007 Mothertongue
2007 Wonders
2007 The Only Tune
2008 The Adulteress
2009 Drones on "O Lord, Whose Mercies Numberless"
2009 Vocalise on "Al lampo dell' armi"
2009 Impossible Things
2010 Let the Night Perish (Job's Curse)
2011 The Map of the World
2011 Four Traditional Songs
2012 Two Hearts, for voice, violin and orchestra
2012 Far Away Songs
2012 Hymns For Private Use
2012 Three Songs
2013 The Brown Girl
2013 Reynardine
2013 So Many Things
2014 Pleasure Ground
2014 Sentences
2016 Two Songs
2018 Land in an Isle
2019 Death in Venice
2019 My Pretty Saro
2019 The Only Tune
2019 Unexpected News

Arrangements and orchestrations
2006 The Letting Go by Bonnie 'Prince' Billy
2007 Miserere Mei (orchestration of William Byrd's Miserere Mei)
2007 Deus and Bow Thine Ear (orchestration of William Byrd's Deus and Bow Thine Ear)
2008 All Is Well by Sam Amidon
2008 "Með þér" and "Á meðan vatnið velgist" on Bestu kveðjur by Sprengjuhöllin
2009 Confessions, a multimedia collaboration with Teitur Lassen.
2009 Various songs on Antony and the Johnsons' album The Crying Light
2009 Various songs on Grizzly Bear's album Veckatimest
2009 Tricks of the Trade on Mew's album No More Stories...
2009 Year of the Dragon on Run Rabbit Run
2009 "So Far Around The Bend" by The National on Dark Was the Night
2010 Various songs on Antony and the Johnsons' album Swanlights
2010 Go by Jónsi
2010 "I See the Sign" by Sam Amidon
2012 "Climax" on Looking 4 Myself by Usher
2010 String arrangements on Antony and the Johnsons' album Cut the World
2013 For Now I Am Winter by Ólafur Arnalds
2015 "Anecdotes" on Joanna Newsom's album Divers
2017 "Fortunate Son", collaboration with Villagers
2021 "If I'm Insecure" on James Blake's album Friends That Break Your Heart

Discography

Studio albums

EPs

Singles 
As primary artist

As composer 
Opera, chorale, and chamber works
FM by Flexible Music (2009) (track: "Flexible Music")
A Good Understanding by Los Angeles Master Chorale (Decca/Universal Classics, 2010)
From Here On Out by Kitchener-Waterloo Symphony (2011) (tracks: From Here On Out and "Wish You Were Here")
Seeing is Believing by the Aurora Orchestra (Decca/Universal Classics, 2011)
Cycles by James McVinnie (Bedroom Community, 2013)
Two Boys from the Metropolitan Opera production (Nonesuch Records, 2014)
Filament by Eighth Blackbird (2015) (tracks: "Doublespeak" and "Two Pages")
Dawn to Dust by Utah Symphony (2016) (track: Control (Five Landscapes for Orchestra))
Variations by Mishka Rushdie Momen (Somm Recordings, 2019) (track: Small Variations)
Three Continents Cello Concerto by Jan Vogler (Sony Classical, 2020) (with Sven Helbig & Zhou Long)

Film scores
Joshua (Original Motion Picture Soundtrack) (Moviescore Media, 2008)
The Reader (Original Motion Picture Soundtrack) (Lakeshore Records, 2009)
Kill Your Darlings (Original Motion Picture Soundtrack) (2013)
Howard's End (Original Soundtrack Album) (miniseries, 2018)
 Pachinko Season 1 (Original Soundtrack Album) (Apple TV+ Original Series, 2022)

As arranger 

 Seeing is Believing by Thomas Gould & Aurora Orchestra (Decca, 2011)

References

Sources
 
 
 Profile and list of published scores, Music Sales Classical

External links

 
 
 
 "Nico Muhly on How a Hitchcock Thriller Inspired His New Opera" by Elizabeth Svokos, allarts.wliw.org, October 17, 2018

Living people
1981 births
Columbia College (New York) alumni
Juilliard School alumni
American male classical composers
American classical composers
Musicians from New York City
21st-century classical composers
LGBT classical composers
American LGBT musicians
Musicians from Vermont
Decca Records artists
Nonesuch Records artists
LGBT classical musicians
21st-century American composers
Classical musicians from New York (state)
21st-century American male musicians